These communities in Canada contain significant Orthodox Jewish populations:

Manitoba 
Tuxedo, Winnipeg, Manitoba
River Heights, Winnipeg, Manitoba
Charleswood, Winnipeg, Manitoba

Ontario 
Bathurst Street, Toronto, Ontario
Glen Park, Toronto, Ontario
Ledbury Park, Toronto, Ontario
Lawrence Manor, Toronto, Ontario
Lawrence Heights, Toronto, Ontario
Clanton Park, Toronto, Ontario
Thornhill, Ontario

Quebec 
Montreal, Quebec
Outremont, Quebec
Westmount, Quebec
Hampstead, Quebec
Côte-Saint-Luc, Quebec
Kiryas Tosh, Boisbriand, Quebec

.Orthodox Jewish
.
Communities